Michael Steven Weisbach is an American economist, currently the Ralph W. Kurtz Chair in Finance at Ohio State University.

References

Year of birth missing (living people)
Place of birth missing (living people)
Living people
Ohio State University faculty
American economists
Massachusetts Institute of Technology alumni
University of Michigan alumni